Lapenda is a surname. Notable people with the surname include:

Frederico Lapenda (born 1968), American film producer
Geraldo Lapenda (1924–2004), Brazilian linguist
Luka Lapenda (born 1988), Swiss footballer